Miskin Abdal  (born: Səyid Huseyn Muhammed oğlu; 1430–1535) was an Azerbaijani folk poet-ashugh, Sufi philosopher-thinker, and statesman, who for many years was in charge of foreign affairs of the Safavid state under Shah Ismail Khatai (1487–1524). He was the founder of the ashugh school.

One of the brightest figures in the history of Azerbaijan,  he played an important role in the development of science and art.

Under the name of Miskin, Abdal (Architect of the soul) was the creator of the literature of Azerbaijani minstrels - ashugh folk singers.

After many years of service at the court of Shah Ismail I Khatai, in 1524 he returned home.  He opened the first school in Sariyagub (now Jaghatsadzor, Gegharkunik region, Armenia)

The author of the epic "Miskin Abdal and Senuber", created in the colloquial genre, tells about the life path of the poet, almost a hundred years of life in palaces, travels, life sufferings of the past.  After the death of Miskin Abdal, this epic was formed on the basis of his poems circulating among the people.

The epic "Shah Ismail and Miskin Abdal" differs from the previous epic and heroic work in its philosophical characteristics.  Its content is based on real historical events.  He also owns the epics "Lev Sahla Ibrahim" and "Orphan Hussein".

Now the house in which he lived and the grave have been visited by numerous admirers of his work for centuries, as a shrine.

Selected works 
 A dağlar səhifə
 A yaz ayları
 Ayaq üstədi
 Ağlaram
 Ağlaram (Sultanlar əyləşdi nərgiz taхtında)
 Ağrı dağı
 Bundan sənə nə
 Əlif-Lam
 Dağlar
 Dağların
 Dönərmi
 Gedər
 Gedəsiyəm mən
 Qaldı
 Qocaldım
 Məni
 Nökərəm
 Olmaz
 Piriydi
 Ya Əli

References

1430 births

1535 deaths